Jason Russo may refer to:

 Jason John Russo, former vocalist with the heavy metal band Herod
 Jason Sebastian Russo (born 1973), singer and guitarist with the psychedelic rock band Hopewell